Bernard du Bec (died May 8, 1149), also known as Bernard le Vénérable, was a Benedictine monk who served as the thirteenth abbot of Mont Saint-Michel. He belonged to a high-ranking noble family in Normandy.

References
French Wikipedia article of same name (see link in navigation bar to left)

French Benedictines
1149 deaths
Year of birth unknown